Stephan Pfister (born ) is a Swiss male curler and curling coach.

As a coach of the Swiss wheelchair curling team, he participated in the 2018 Winter Paralympics and 2022 Winter Paralympics.

Record as a coach of national teams

References

External links

Positive Coach - Stefan Pfister
 
Video: 

Living people
1956 births
Swiss male curlers
Swiss curling coaches